The Robert Award for Best Actor in a Supporting Television Role is one of the merit awards presented by the Danish Film Academy at the annual Robert Awards ceremony. The award has been handed out since 2013.

Honorees

2010s 
 2013: Olaf Johannessen – Forbrydelsen 3
 2014: Christian Tafdrup – Borgen III
 2015: Mikkel Følsgaard – The Legacy

References

External links 
  

2013 establishments in Denmark
Awards established in 2013
Actor in a Supporting Television Role
Television awards for Best Supporting Actor